Buprofezin is an insecticide used for control of insect pests such as mealybugs, leafhoppers and whitefly on vegetable crops. It is a growth regulator, acting as an inhibitor of chitin synthesis. It is banned in some countries due to its negative environmental impacts, being especially toxic to aquatic organisms as well as non-target insects, though is of low toxicity to humans and other mammals.

References

Insecticides
Isopropyl compounds
Tert-butyl compounds
Thiadiazinanes
Ureas